Kristjan Ilves (born 10 June 1996 in Tartu) is an Estonian Nordic combined skier.

Ilves competed at the 2014 Winter Olympics for Estonia. He placed 41st in the normal hill Nordic combined event and 34th in the large hill event.

As of March 2021, his best showing at the World Championships was 8th in the 2021 team sprint. His best individual finish was 11th in the large hill event during the same championships.

Ilves made his World Cup debut in February 2013. His best World Cup overall finish is 5th in the 2021–22 season.

He represented Estonia at the 2018 Winter Olympics and finished 16th in the Individual normal hill event. He competed in the 2022 Winter Olympics.

Record

Olympic Games

World Championship

World Cup results

Season standings

Podiums

References

1996 births
Living people
Olympic Nordic combined skiers of Estonia
Nordic combined skiers at the 2014 Winter Olympics
Nordic combined skiers at the 2018 Winter Olympics
Nordic combined skiers at the 2022 Winter Olympics
Sportspeople from Tartu
Estonian male Nordic combined skiers
Nordic combined skiers at the 2012 Winter Youth Olympics